Thebe may refer to:

 Any of several female characters in Greek mythology - see List of mythological figures named Thebe
 Thebe (moon), a moon of Jupiter
 Thebe (currency), 1/100 of a Botswana pula
 Thebe, an Amazon
 Thebe, alternate name for the Titaness Phoebe
 Thebe Hypoplakia, a city in ancient Anatolia
 Thebe Magugu, South African fashion designer
 Thebe Medupe, South African astrophysicist

See also
 Thebes (disambiguation)